Luc Bernard is a British game designer and artist best known for creating the video games Death Tales, Eternity's Child, Mecho Wars, Desert Ashes, Plague Road, Pocket God vs Desert Ashes and SteamPirates. He is also known for Imagination Is The Only Escape which remains unreleased.

Games
Bernard's first video game was the platformer Eternity's Child.

Imagination Is The Only Escape, a game that deals with the Holocaust, has also courted controversy for its dark setting and subject matter.

Although declaring that he would quit the game industry, Bernard later came back and founded Oyaji Games in the United States. Oyaji Games first game Mecho Wars received a better reception.

Luc Bernard released a role-playing video game for the iPhone called SteamPirates.

Bernard announced the PS4 PS Vita free to play action role-playing game Death Tales  and a spinoff in the Pocket God franchise in 2015.

Kitten Squad which he directed for PETA was released on 15 September.

In November launched the successful Kickstarter campaign for Plague Road, along with one of the reviewers of Eternity's Child and Jim Sterling as narrator.

On 21 March the Beta for Death Tales was launched on PlayStation 4.

References

British video game designers
British Jews
Living people
1986 births